Sitting Bull College is a public tribal land-grant college in Fort Yates, North Dakota.  It was founded in 1973 by the Standing Rock Sioux tribe of the Standing Rock Indian Reservation in south-central North Dakota. The SBC campuses are located in Fort Yates, North Dakota and McLaughlin, South Dakota. It serves as the primary educational institution on the Standing Rock Reservation.

History

In 1973, the Standing Rock Sioux Tribal Council chartered Standing Rock Community College. The name was changed from Standing Rock College to Sitting Bull College in 1996. In 1994, the college was designated a land-grant college alongside 31 other tribal colleges.

Academics
Sitting Bull College offers the Master of Science, Bachelor of Science, Associate of Arts, Associate of Science, and Associate of Applied Science degrees.  It also offers certificates.

Partnerships

SBC is a member of the American Indian Higher Education Consortium (AIHEC), which is a community of tribally and federally chartered institutions working to strengthen tribal nations and make a lasting difference in the lives of American Indians and Alaska Natives. SBC was created in response to the higher education needs of American Indians. SBC generally serves geographically isolated populations that have no other means of accessing education beyond the high school level.

References

External links
Official website

Public universities and colleges in North Dakota
Buildings and structures in Sioux County, North Dakota
American Indian Higher Education Consortium
Educational institutions established in 1973
Education in Sioux County, North Dakota
Standing Rock Sioux Tribe